The 1967–68 season was FC Dinamo București's 19th season in Divizia A. Dinamo wins for the third time the Romanian Cup. In the final, Dinamo defeats Rapid București after extra-time. In the championship, Dinamo finishes third, two points behind the first two teams, Steaua and FC Argeş.

Results

Romanian Cup final

Squad 

Goalkeepers: Ilie Datcu, Spiridon Niculescu.

Defenders: Alexandru Boc, Ion Nunweiller, Cornel Popa, Lazăr Pârvu, Mircea Stoenescu, Constantin Ștefan.

Midfielders: Cornel Dinu, Vasile Gergely, Radu Nunweiller, Viorel Sălceanu.

Forwards: Florea Dumitrache, Ion Haidu, Mircea Lucescu, Nicolae Nagy, Ion Pîrcălab, Octavian Popescu, Iosif Varga.

Transfers 

Mircea Lucescu returns after the loan to Politehnica București. Alexandru Boc is transferred from Petrolul Ploiesti. Lică Nunweiller, Gheorghe Ene and Daniel Ene are transferred to Dinamo Bacau, and Gheorghe Grozea is transferred to Petrolul.

References 
 www.labtof.ro
 www.romaniansoccer.ro

1967
Association football clubs 1967–68 season
Dinamo